Juan Carmona (born 1932) is a Chilean rower. He competed in the men's coxed pair event at the 1956 Summer Olympics.

References

1932 births
Living people
Chilean male rowers
Olympic rowers of Chile
Rowers at the 1956 Summer Olympics
Place of birth missing (living people)
20th-century Chilean people